WOOH-LD (channel 29) is a low-power television station licensed to Zanesville, Ohio, United States, but serving the Columbus area with programming from the digital multicast network Heartland. The station is owned and operated by Luken Communications, and maintains a transmitter on Alton-Darby Road near Hilliard, Ohio. 

It was most recently a repeater that broadcast programming from the Trinity Broadcasting Network, via satellite. TBN took the then-W16BT silent on March 26, 2010, due to Trinity's purchase of WSFJ-TV (channel 51), a full power station broadcasting from neighboring Licking County. The station changed its call sign to WOOH-LP on September 20, 2017.

Technical information

Subchannels
The station's digital signal is multiplexed:

References

Low-power television stations in the United States
Television channels and stations established in 1992
OOH-LD
1992 establishments in Ohio
Heartland (TV network) affiliates
Retro TV affiliates
Rev'n affiliates